"I'm Alive" is a 1965 number-one UK hit single by the Hollies, written  for them by American songwriter Clint Ballard Jr. However they originally passed the song over to another Manchester band, the Toggery Five, before changing their minds and recording the song, which became their first No. 1 hit in the UK Singles Chart. It spent three weeks at number one in the UK and was also a No. 1 hit in Ireland. The song was released as a single in the US, entering the Cash Box singles chart on July 17, 1965, and peaking at No. 84 week of August 14, 1965; it also appears on the US version of the 1965 Hollies album, Hear! Here!.

Cash Box described it as "a low-key, rhythmic romancer about a lad whose on cloud since he met the girl of his dreams."

Charts

Cover Versions
Syndicate of Sound covered this song on their only album Little Girl in 1966.
The song was covered by Gamma in 1979 on their debut album, Gamma 1, whose version peaked at #60 on the Hot 100.
In 1983 the Hi-NRG group American Fade also covered the song which is listed on HotDiscoMix's Hi-NRG Top 200 — Hits of the 80's.

References

1965 singles
The Hollies songs
Irish Singles Chart number-one singles
UK Singles Chart number-one singles
Songs written by Clint Ballard Jr.
Parlophone singles
1965 songs
Imperial Records singles
1979 singles